NA-136 Okara-I is a constituency for the National Assembly of Pakistan.

Members of Parliament

2018-2022: NA-141 Okara-I

Election 2002 

General elections were held on 10 Oct 2002. Rai Muhammad Aslam Kharal of PML-Q won by 50,106 votes.

Election 2008 

General elections were held on 18 Feb 2008. Captain(R) Rai Ghulam Mujataba of PPP won by 63,960 votes.
Second highest vote were polled in favor of mr. Muhammad Aslam Khan Kharral	of Pakistan Muslim League. He got 43798 votes.

Election 2013 

General elections were held on 11 May 2013. Chaudhary Nadeem Abbas of PML-N won by 90,652 votes and became the  member of National Assembly.

Election 2018 

General elections were held on 25 July 2018.

See also
NA-134 Kasur-IV
NA-136 Okara-II

References

External links 
 Election result's official website

NA-143